Gafoor is a surname. Notable people with the surname include:

 B. M. Gafoor (1942–2003), Indian cartoonist and comic artist
 Hasan Gafoor (1950–2012), Indian public official
 Naslen K. Gafoor, Indian actor
 P. K. Abdul Gafoor (died 1984), Indian educator

See also
 GAFOR